Aragüés Aragonese is the Aragonese variety spoken in Aragüés and Jasa. It is very similar to Cheso, and better preserved than Aísa Aragonese.

Morphology 

 Define article system is lo, la, los, las.
 The endings in indefinite past are -o as in Tensinian Aragonese: pagomos, (paguemos), cantoz, (cantez). In the third person in plural we have -oron just in the first conjugation: cantoron, but in the 2nd and in the 3rd person we have -ieron or -io(ro)n: salieron, partioron, riyeron, faborezión.
In irregular verbs with -i in present, we find this -i in yo foi but not in yo bó.
 There are, as in Sobrarbe "strong perfects": fízon, trújon.

Lexicon 
They are words different from those from Aísa Aragonese (Estarrún Valley).
 tabuzo, charga (barza in the Estarrún Valley), argüella, betiello.

See also 
Aragonese dialects

Aragonese dialects